Navy Hill School was a school serving African American students in Richmond, Virginia. The school was in Richmond's Navy Hill neighborhood and opened in 1871. It was at Sixth Street and Duval Street. It was the first public school in Richmond to employ African American teachers.

In 1876 the school was recommended for closure due to poor conditions. It was still operating in 1891. City documents in 1890 described the school's building as in poor condition and having been poorly built. A 1904 city directory includes teachers at the school and list Stephen T. Pendelton as its principal. Lizzie Knowles also served as principal of the school.

Daniel Webster Davis began teaching at the school in 1879. Daniel Barclay Williams taught at the school during the 1880s.

Maggie Walker attended the school for two years.

From 1977 to 2000 the Children's Museum of Richmond was housed in what was once the school's gymnasium.

References

Schools in Richmond, Virginia
Defunct schools in Virginia
1871 establishments in Virginia